Todd Armstrong (born John Harris Armstrong; July 25, 1937 – November 17, 1992) was an American actor who appeared in ten films and several television series. He is best known for playing the titular role in the cult classic Jason and the Argonauts (1963), after which his career rapidly waned. He also starred in syndicated crime drama Manhunt.

Early life
Todd Armstrong was born in St. Louis, Missouri on July 25, 1937, the third of three children. He had two older sisters, Joan and Jeffrey. His parents were Louise Armstrong (née McClelland) and Harris Armstrong (born 1899). Armstrong's father was born in St. Louis (Missouri) and a well-known architect who designed many civil landmarks in St. Louis, such as The Shanley Building at 7800 Maryland Avenue in Clayton. Its design won Armstrong the silver medal at the Paris Exposition of 1937.

In 1956, Armstrong graduated from Ladue High School, where one of his classmates was Auggie Busch, a great-grandson of Anheuser-Busch brewing magnate Adolphus Busch. He moved to California and trained drama at the prestigious acting school Pasadena Playhouse College of Theatre Arts, where he changed his first name to Todd.  He graduated in 1958 with classmates including Dustin Hoffman and Gene Hackman.

Career
Armstrong’s wealthy parents set him up with a trust fund but after a couple of years with no success landing acting roles, he took part-time work as a landscape gardener. One of his clients was actress Gloria Henry, who played the mother on the Dennis the Menace television series. Henry learned of her gardener's acting aspirations and was impressed enough by Armstrong's good looks to arrange for him to get a screen test at Columbia Pictures, where she was under contract. He landed a supporting role in the third season of the television show Manhunt, playing Detective Carl Spencer in thirteen episodes in the 1961 season (credited as Todd Armstrong). In 1962, Armstrong made his film debut with a small role in director Edward Dmytryk's drama Walk on the Wild Side (sole credit as Todd Anderson). He made his second movie appearance that year in Five Finger Exercise (his credit reverted to Todd Armstrong). 

His first and most prominent leading role in a film was portraying the title character in Jason and the Argonauts (1963). A majority of the cast were British, and Armstrong's voice and that of his co-star Nancy Kovack were dubbed by British actors, with Tim Turner voicing the character of Jason. Todd had only one additional leading role, in the 1965 World War II film King Rat, after which he receded to supporting parts in pictures such as Dead Heat on a Merry-Go-Round (1966), and gradually moved back into television work. His final credit as an actor was in Icebound in the Antarctic (1983), portraying Raymond Shackleton.

Death
Armstrong "married a  pianist and settled down in the Virgin Islands". In 1992, he suffered an injury while working, and soon became addicted to painkillers. After this, he killed himself by gunshot on November 17 of that same year. He was 55..

Filmography
Armstrong appeared in the following film and television roles:

 Manhunt (13 TV episodes, 1961) as Detective Carl Spencer
 Walk on the Wild Side (1962) as Lt. Omar Stroud (credited as Todd Anderson)
 Five Finger Exercise (1962) as Tony Blake
 Jason and the Argonauts (1963) as Jason Jason and the Golden Fleece
 King Rat (1965) as Tex: The American Hut
 The Silencers (1966) as Guard (uncredited)
 Scalplock (1966) (television) as Dave Tarrant.  When the film became the television series The Iron Horse, Armstrong's original role was played by Gary Collins
 Dead Heat on a Merry-Go-Round (1966) as Alfred Morgan
 Winnetou and Old Firehand (1966)  as Toma.k.a. Thunder at the Border (UK), a.k.a. Winnetou: Thunder at the Border (USA)
 A Time for Killing (1967) as Lt. 'Pru' Prudessinga.k.a. The Long Ride Home (UK)
 Gunsmoke as John Wing / John August (2 TV episodes, 1968)a.k.a. Gun Law (UK), a.k.a. Marshal Dillon (USA: rerun title)
 - "9:12 to Dodge" (1968) television episode (as Johnny August)
 - "The First People" (1968) television episode (as John Eagle Wing)
 Nakia (1 television episode, 1974)
 Hawaii Five-O as Curt Anderson (1 TV episode, 1975)a.k.a. McGarrett (USA: rerun title)
 - "Target? the Lady" (1975) television episode (as Curt Anderson)
 The Greatest American Hero as Ted McSherry (1 TV episode, 1982)
 Shackleton (1983) (TV) as Raymond Shackletona.k.a. Icebound in the Antarctic (USA) (final appearance)

References

External links

1937 births
1992 deaths
20th-century American male actors
Male actors from Pasadena, California
Male actors from St. Louis
American male film actors
American male television actors
Ladue Horton Watkins High School alumni
Male actors from Los Angeles County, California
Male actors from Missouri
People from Glenn County, California
Suicides by firearm in California
1992 suicides